HMS Port Mahon was a member of the Gibraltar Group of 24-gun sixth rates. After commissioning she spent her career in Home waters and North America on trade protection duties. She was broken at Plymouth in May 1740.

Port Mahon was the first named vessel in the Royal Navy.

Construction
She was ordered on 24 January 1711 from Deptford Dockyard to be built under the guidance of Joseph Allin the elder, Master Shipwright of Portsmouth. She was launched on 18 October 1711.

Commissioned service
She was commissioned in 1712 under the command of Commander William Haddock, RN (promoted to captain in January 1713) for service with Baker's Squadron on the Portuguese coast. In 1713 she was off Sale, Morocco. She returned to Portsmouth to undergo a great repair costing £524.0.4d1/4 from October 1714 to December 1715. In May 1716 she commissioned under the command of Captain William Smith, RN for service in the Baltic. She returned in the fall of 1718 for a great repair at Deptford from December 1718 to March 17191720 at a cost of £1,181.11.11d. She was commissioned in January 1720 under Captain James Luck, RN followed by Captain Daniel Morris, RN in September 1720 for service in the Baltic. In 1722 she was on quarantine guard in 1722 then the English Channel between 1724 and 1725 for anti-smuggling operations. She was refitted at Sheerness for £1,408.6.10d from September to November 1727. In November 1727 she was commissioned under Captain Christopher Pocklington for service on the Ireland station. She was paid off in November 1731. In 1732 She was under Captain Samuel Atkins, RN on the Ireland station. In June 1738 she was under Captain Gilbert Wallis, RN for Home Waters followed by Captain John Forbes in October 1738.

Disposition
HMS Port Mahon was broken by Admiralty Order (AO) 4 October 1739 at Plymouth in May 1740ref>Winfield 2007</ref>.

Notes

Citations

References
 Winfield 2009, British Warships in the Age of Sail (1603 – 1714), by Rif Winfield, published by Seaforth Publishing, England © 2009, EPUB , Chapter 6, The Sixth Rates, Vessels acquired from 2 May 1660, Gibraltar Group, Port Mahon
 Winfield 2007, British Warships in the Age of Sail (1714 – 1792), by Rif Winfield, published by Seaforth Publishing, England © 2007, EPUB , Chapter 6, Sixth Rates, Sixth Rates of 20 or 24 guns, Vessels in Service at 1 August 1714, Gibraltar Group, Port Mahon
 Colledge, Ships of the Royal Navy, by J.J. Colledge, revised and updated by Lt Cdr Ben Warlow and Steve Bush, published by Seaforth Publishing, Barnsley, Great Britain, © 2020, EPUB , (EPUB), Section P (Port Mahon)

 

1710s ships
Corvettes of the Royal Navy
Ships built in Portsmouth
Naval ships of the United Kingdom